= 1963 Ålandic legislative election =

Legislative elections were held in Åland on 6 October 1963.

== Results ==
Party	Votes	%	Seats	+/–
Åländsk samling I - Borgerliga eller opolitiska	4,241	72.87	22	–3
Åländsk samling II - Fria löntagare, arbetare, småbrukare, fiskare och sjöman	1,371	23.56	7	New
Folkdemokraterna	208	3.57	1	0
Total	5,820	100.00	30	0
